Koovathur (North) is a village in the Udayarpalayam taluk of Ariyalur district, Tamil Nadu, India.

Demographics 

As per the 2001 census, Koovathur (Nouth) had a total population of 2491 with 1261 males and 1230 females.

See also
Koovathur (South)

References 

Villages in Ariyalur district